Helena Štěrbová (born 5 April 1988) is a Czech handball player for Handball des Collines  and the Czech national team.

References

1988 births
Living people
Czech female handball players